was a Japanese samurai of the Azuchi–Momoyama period. He was the third son of Chōsokabe Motochika, the lord of Tosa Province. He became the adopted son of Tsuno Katsuoki, taking the name .

In 1600, Chikatada executed by order of his younger brother Chōsokabe Morichika, who had questioned his right to be Motochika's heir, as ruler of Tosa Province.

Family
Great-grandfather: Chōsokabe Kanetsugu (died 1508) 
Grandfather: Chōsokabe Kunichika (1504–1560) 
Father: Chōsokabe Motochika (1539–1599)
Brothers:
 Chōsokabe Nobuchika (1565–1587)
 Chōsokabe Morichika (1575–1615)
 Kagawa Chikakazu (1567-1587)

See also
List of Google.jp books
Samuri Archive article 

Daimyo
1572 births
1600 deaths
Chōsokabe clan

References